Elena Nikandrovna Klokacheva (also known as Klakachova (Клакачова) and Klakacheva (Клакачева); Saint Petersburg, Russia, 25 November 1871 – not before 1943), was a painter mainly known by one of the few existing portraits of Rasputín, now at the Hermitage. In 1942 and 1943, during the Siege of Leningrad, she draw some portraits of Spanish military physicians belonging to the Wehrmacht Blue Division.

Biography 
Elena Nikandrovna Klokacheva was born in a distinguished navy officers family. Fedot Alekséevich Klokachev (Федот Алексеевич Клокачёв,1739-1783), Vice admiral of the Black Sea fleet, was Klokacheva's great-great-grandfather. Her father, Nikandr Nikolaevich Klokachev (Никандр Николаевич Клокачёв), was Rear admiral.

She studied at the Gymnasium "Maria Nikolaevna Stoiunina" and, since 1891, at the Imperial Academy of Arts.

Since 1902 she appeared in the directory All Petersburg (Весь Петербург), sometimes as Klokacheva and others as Klakacheva, with different addresses. Since 1906 she lived in Serguiévskaya street that changed its name to Tchaikovsky street in 1923. From 1917 on, her name disappears from the directory. Since 1922 she lived in Pavlovsk.

In 1910, the writer Evdokiia Nagródskaia (Евдокия Аполлоновна Нагродская) dedicated to Klokachova her novel The Wrath of Dionysus (Гнев Диониса,Saint Petersburg,Тип. Н.Я. Стойковой, 1910).

In 1942 and 1943, the Spanish Blue Division, participating in the Siege of Leningrad, had a field dressing station in Pavlovsk. Klokacheva made charcoal portraits of some of the Spanish military physicians on assignment there. Their families hold two of these portraits in Spain.

The date and place of her death are unknown.

Artistic career 
She studied painting at the Imperial Academy of Arts in Saint Petersburg (Императорская Академия Xудожеств); during 1891 and 1892 with Pavel Chistiakov and then with Pavel Kovalevsky. In 1899 she went to Munich to study with the Slovene painter Anton Ažbe and with Franz von Lenbach.

Klokacheva took part in some of the exhibitions of the Peredvizhniki (The Wanderers or The Itinerants) group whose best known member was Ilya Repin.

In 1901 she was entitled "artist” (Russian: художника) for her picture “Behind the scenes” (За кулисами). The Academy had accepted full membership of women just in 1873.

At the beginning of the 20th century she traveled to Tunisia, Sicily and to Russian Turkestan from where he drew inspiration for many of his Orientalist-style works.

In 1907, the Academy acquired her work At the circus; her picture Hard days and a portrait of her friend, the art historian Olga Bazankur (Ольга Георгиевна Базанкур-Штейнфельд) were exhibited in Saint Petersburg and Moscow.

In 1909 she took part in the spring exhibition at the Imperial Academy of Arts with her work “Satyr and nymph”.

Klokacheva participated in the artistic circles of her time in Saint Petersburg; she was friend with the writers Nadezhda Aleksandrovna Lukhmanova (Надежда Александровна Лухманова) and Evdokiia Nagródskaia. At the Imperial Academy some of her colleagues were Maria Alekseevna Fedorova (Мария Алексеевна Фёдорова), Elizabeta Mikhailovna Martynova (Елизавета Михайловна Мартынова), and Anna Petrovna Ostroumova-Lebedeva. She posed for the photographer Elena Lukinichna Mrozovskaya -Helène de Mrosovsky- (Елена Лукинична Мрозовская).

He was a member of the St. Petersburg Society of Painters (Санкт-Петербургское общество художников (1890 —1918)).

Works 

 Portrait of Rasputin, signed and dated in 1914, colour pencils and pastel on grey card, 81.5 x 56 cm, Hermitage Museum, Saint Petersburg
 A scene from the life of the Boyars (Сцена из боярской жизни), signed, oil on canvas, 107 x 76 cm
At the circus (В цирке, or За кулисами, or За кулисами цирка), 1901, oil, reproduced in Niva, 22, 1902, p. 429
Icarus (Икар or Смерть Икара),1901, oil, reproduced in the magazine Niva (Нива), 6, 1902, pág. 104 and in postcards at the turn of the 20th century
Carousel (Карусель), 1904, oil
 Г-жи Л. К, 1904
 Portrait of Krasinski (Портрет гр. Красинской), 1905, colour pencils
 Young girl (Девочка), 1905
Portrait of Olga Bazankur (Портрет г-жи О.Г. Базанкур), 1906, colour pencils, reproduced in Нива, 46, 1908, p. 798
 Hard days (Тяжелые дни), 1907, oil
 Portrait of general Aleksandr Kiriev (Александр Алексеевич Киреев), 1907,  reproduced in Новое Время, February 14, 1907, p. 6
 Tartar women (Татарские женщины), 1908
 Portrait of M. A. Lishin (Портрет М. А. Лишина), 1908
 Portrait of the artist Aksarina (Портрет артистки Аксариной), 1909, colour pencils
 Satyr and nymph (Сатир и нимфа), 1909, pastel, reproduced in Огонëк , 10, 1909, p. 15, and in postcards at the turn of the 20th century
 Portrait of the Cech actress Bella Gorskaya (Бэлла Горская), 1911, colour pencils
Legend of the knight Romuald of Burgundy (Легенда о рыцаре Ромуальде Бургундской or Рыцарь Ромуальд в очарованном лесу), 1911, oil

 The warrior or Churila Plenkovich (Витязь or Чурила Пленкович), 1911, reproduced in postcards at the turn of the 20th century
 Портрет арт. Миесс Мод Робертсон, 1911
 Portrait of the singer M. Karinskaya (Портрет певицы М. Каринской), 1911
Love (Любовь or Amore), 1912, oil, reproduced in postcards at the turn of the 20th century
Portrait of Cardinal Rampolla, 1913, reproduced in Новое Время, December 14, 1913, p. 8
Горе, 1913, oil
 At the Bazaar of Samarkand (На базаре Самарканд), 1914
On the roofs of Samarkand (На крышах Самарканд), 1914, oil, reproduced in postcards at the turn of the 20th century
Alley of Samarkand (Уличка Самарканд), 1915
Portrait of count J. de Lalaing (Графъ Ж. де-Лалэнгъ), 1915, reproduced in Новое Время, November 14, 1915, p. 11
On the street (На улице), 1915, reproduced in Огонëк, 47, November 22, 1915
Bazaar (Базар), 1915
Portrait of the English Actress Douglas (Портрет Английской Артистки Дугласъ), 1915, reproduced in Огонëк, 47, November 22, 1915
Tunisia (Тунис), 1917
 Portrait of the writer Pyotr Gnedich, Reproduced in Niva, 6, 1917, p. 95
 Portrait of Sergei Zavadsky (Сергей Владиславич Завадский), 1917
 Oriental tale (Восточная Сказка), 1918
 Bacha Mamed (Бача Мамед), reproduced in Нива, 18, 1918, p. 276
Dream (Мечты), reproduced in postcards at the turn of the 20th century
Gossip (Сплетни)
 The tsarevich swan (Царевич лебедь)
 Portraits of Christopher of Greece, Lev Kasso, and the general Ivan Dumbadze

Gallery

References 

1871 births
19th-century painters from the Russian Empire
20th-century Russian painters
Russian painters
Russian portrait painters
Painters from Saint Petersburg
Year of death missing
20th-century Russian women artists
19th-century women artists from the Russian Empire